Swiftia pallida is a species of gorgonian-type octocoral in the family Plexauridae sometimes known as the northern sea fan. At one time it was considered to be a subspecies of Swiftia rosea.

Description
Swiftia pallida usually has a single main stem arising from a narrow base and is sparsely branched. The polyps are mostly arranged alternately, but somewhat irregularly, on either side of the stem and branches. Each polyp is supported by eight spindle-shaped sclerites, spiny skeletal elements, which run from the stem or branch to the bases of the eight tentacles. In the north of its range, this species is usually white or pale grey, but in the Mediterranean it may be pink or red. This sea fan resembles pale varieties of the more common Swiftia rosea but is less bushy with fewer branches.

Distribution and habitat
Swiftia pallida is native to the northeast Atlantic Ocean, the Mediterranean Sea, the Bay of Biscay, Madeira and Morocco. This sea fan also occurs in deep water on the continental shelf off the Atlantic coast of North America. It is found on rocks in tide-swept areas that are sheltered from excessive wave action. It often occurs in areas where a layer of sediment covers the rocks, or on large pebbles lying on a silty or broken shell seabed.

Ecology
The sea fan anemone (Amphianthus dohrnii) seems to live exclusively on sea fans. In the northern part of its range it is associated with Swiftia pallida, and in the southern part with  the pink sea fan (Eunicella verrucosa).

References

Plexauridae
Animals described in 1970